Japan–Turkey relations are foreign relations between Japan and Turkey. Japan has an embassy in Ankara and a consulate-general in Istanbul. Turkey has an embassy in Tokyo and a consulate-general in Nagoya. The relationship has been described as "close".

History

Ottoman Empire

Relations between the two countries started in the 19th century. A foundational event occurred in 1890, when the Turkish frigate Ertuğrul hit a reef and sank off the coast of Wakayama, Japan, after having an audience with the Meiji Emperor. The surviving sailors were taken back to Istanbul by two Japanese frigates. A monument commemorating the Ottoman sailors has been erected in Kushimoto of Wakayama Prefecture, near the Kushimoto Turkish Memorial and Museum. In 2015, marking the 125th anniversary of friendship between Japan and Turkey, the movie "125 Years Memory" was released. The motion picture reflects two historical incidents in Japanese-Turkish relations, the sinking of the Ertuğrul and the evacuation of Japanese nationals from Iran in 1985.

In the late 19th and early 20th centuries, a veritable Nipponophilia took hold of the Ottoman press with hundreds upon hundreds of articles written dealing with Japan. As an Eastern people who originated in Central Asia, many Turks felt a special affinity for another Eastern, Asian nation like Japan, which had modernized without becoming westernized. Further adding to the mutual attraction between the Turks and the Japanese was their shared enmity towards Russia, the archenemy of the Ottomans for centuries and the new archenemy of Japan. Already starting to promote the ideology of Pan-Asianism, the Japanese start to court the Sublime Porte with the Meiji Emperor sending princes of the House of Yamato to visit the Sultan-Caliph  Abdul Hamid II bearing gifts and proposals for treaties, which generated much excitement in the Ottoman press. Abdul Hamid II, who while admiring Japan to a certain extent, was obsessed with the fear sparked by popular rumors that the Meiji Emperor would convert to Islam and proclaim himself Caliph, thereby displacing him as the object of veneration from all the world's Sunni Muslims.

The Committee of Union and Progress (CUP) greatly admired Japan, which they took as their model. The fact that an Asian nation like Japan had defeated Russia in 1905, the traditional enemy of the Ottoman Empire, was very inspiring to the Unionists, and Unionist newspapers all portrayed Japan's victory as a triumph not only over Russia, but also over Western values. The Unionists especially admired the Japanese for their embrace of Western science and technology without losing their "Eastern spiritual essence", which was seen as proving that one could modernize without embracing Western values, providing the inspiration to make the Ottoman Empire into the "Japan of the Near East". The Turks originated as a people living north of the Great Wall of China, with the first mention of the Turks in history occurring in a letter written to the Chinese emperor Wen in 585 AD. Over the centuries the Turks had wandered across Eurasia, settling in very large numbers in Anatolia after their victory over the Romans at the Battle of Manzikert in 1071. The Unionists were proud of the East Asian origins of the Turkish people, and spent much time glorying Turan, which was the name they had adopted for the homeland of the Turks in East Asia that was located somewhere north of the Great Wall of China. As the Chinese and Arabs were the traditional enemies of the Turks, there no ties of friendship to celebrate with those peoples. Ziya Gökalp, the chief ideologue of the Young Turks charged in a 1913 essay that "the sword of the Turk and likewise his pen have exalted the Arabs, the Chinese and the Persians" rather than themselves and that the modern Turks "needed to turn back to their ancient past". Gökalp argued it was time for the Turks to once again study the important figures of their own Turco-Mongol tradition, such as Attila the Hun, Genghis Khan, Timur, and Hulagu Khan.

The modernization policies carried out by the Unionist regime starting in 1908 after the Young Turk revolution were closely modeled after the modernization of Meiji Japan. One Unionist, Colonel Pertev Bey wrote after the revolution of 1908: "We will rise shortly... with the same brilliance as the Rising Sun of the Far East did a few years ago! In any case, let us not forget that a nation always rises from its own strength!". In an inversion of Western paranoia about the "Yellow Peril", the Young Turks often fantasised about creating an alliance with Japan that would unite all the peoples of "the East" to wage war against the much hated Western nations that dominated the world, a "Yellow wave" that would wash away European civilisation for good. For the Young Turks, the term yellow (which was in fact a derogatory Western term for East Asians, based upon their perceived skin colour) stood for the "Eastern gold", the innate moral superiority of Eastern peoples over the corrupt West. In the eyes of the Unionists, it was the civilisations of the Middle East, the Indian subcontinent, and the Far East that were the superior civilisations to Western civilisation, and it was merely an unfortunate accident of history that the West had happened to become more economically and technologically advanced than the Asian civilisations, something that they were determined to correct. The Young Turks were very impressed with how the Japanese had fought the Russian-Japanese war, observing that because of Bushido ("the way of the warrior"), the fierce warrior code of the samurai, that all Japanese males were indoctrinated in after the Meiji Restoration that the Japanese had no fear of death as for them it was the greatest honor to die for the Emperor while the Russians were afraid to die and did not know why they were fighting in Manchuria, thus giving the Japanese the edge in combat. The Unionists intended to emulate the Japanese example by creating a militaristic educational system designed to make every man a soldier and every woman into essentially a soldier-making machine; the concept of jihad would play the same role in motivating the Turkish soldier to fight and die for the caliph (regarded as Allah's representative on the Earth) as Bushido did for the Japanese soldier to die for his emperor (regarded by the Japanese as a living god). From the Meiji Restoration to 1945, Japanese students were taught that Bushido was the highest moral code, that for a man it was the greatest honor to die for the Emperor while for a woman it was the greatest honor to bear sons who would die for the Emperor. As with the case of the oligarchy that ruled Meiji Japan, the purpose of the modernization policies of the CUP regime to allow the nation to win wars, and the educational policies of the CUP regime, which were closely modeled after the Japanese educational system, were meant to train the male students to be soldiers when they become adults. The Turkish historian Handan Nezir Akmeșe wrote that the most important factor in Unionist thinking was the "devaluation of life", the belief that Eastern peoples like the Japanese and the Turks attached no value to human life including their own, and unlike the Westerners who allegedly clung pathetically to their lives when confronted with danger, Easterners supposedly died willingly and happily for the cause.

Efforts to establish treaty relations between Japan and the Ottoman Empire failed because of Japan's insistence that it receive capitulations like the other Great Powers and the Empire's demand that the two countries negotiate only as absolute equals. During World War I, Japan was one of the Allies while the Turkish Ottoman Empire was one of the Central Powers.

Republic of Turkey
Following the founding of the Republic of Turkey, diplomatic relations were established in 1924 and first embassies were opened in 1925. The first Japanese ambassador to Turkey was Sadatsuchi Uchida, who later in 1926 proposed and established the Japan-Turkey Society, a non-profit organization aiming mutual exchange between Turkey and Japan.

While Turkey had declared war on Japan in February 1945, it was also entirely symbolic. So in 1985, the almost century old gesture of kindness was reciprocated during the Iran–Iraq War. As hostilities escalated to an extent that all aircraft were threatened with being shot-down, Turkey sent an aircraft in to rescue 215 Japanese nationals who were living in Tehran at the time. The Turkish government issued a statement: "We have not forgotten the rescue of the sailors of the Ertuğrul. Thus, once we heard there were Japanese citizens in need of help, we went to their rescue."

2010 marked the 120th anniversary of Turko-Japanese relations with over 186 events held throughout Turkey during the year. In this year, Turkey held the 
"Japan Year 2010 in Turkey." On July 10, 2010, Prince Tomohito of Mikasa, cousin of the emperor, attended the opening ceremony of the Kaman Kalehöyük Archaeological Museum. The museum was built with funding from Japan. The prince has often engaged himself actively to promote Japanese-Turkish relations. Moreover, in the wake of Great East Japan earthquake in March 2011 and the earthquakes in Turkey's eastern part in October and November 2011 respectively, both countries provided each other with support, which strengthened the relationship between the two nationals.

The year 2019 is the "Turkey Year" in Japan.

Political relations 

Turkey and Japan are both members of the Organisation for Economic Co-operation and Development (OECD), G20 and the World Trade Organization (WTO). Also Turkey is a member of the Council of Europe, and the Organization for Security and Co-operation in Europe (OSCE),  and Japan is an observer.

There are 4,444 (2010) Turkish citizens living in Japan, constituting an important aspect of Turkey's relations with Japan.

The Japan-Turkey Society was established in 1926 and has since been promoting amicable relations between Japan and Turkey through seminars, the arts, language and cultural exchange and even culinary exchange activities. 

The Turkey-Japan Cultural Dialog Society was founded in 2006, but records cultural and other types of exchange activities between Japan and Turkey since 1873.

According to the public survey in Turkey conducted by the Japanese Foreign Ministry in 2012, 83.2% of respondents answered that the relations between Japan and Turkey are "friendly" or "almost friendly".

Japan criticized the 2019 Turkish offensive into north-eastern Syria. Foreign minister, Toshimitsu Motegi, said in a statement: "Japan is deeply concerned that the latest military operation would make the settlement of Syrian crisis more difficult and cause further deterioration of the humanitarian situation. Japan once again underscores its position that the Syrian crisis cannot be solved by any military means."

Both countries cooperated during the escape of the former Nissan executive Carlos Ghosn.

High-level Visits

Economic relations

See also 

 Foreign relations of Japan
 Foreign relations of Turkey
 Japanese people in Turkey
 Turks in Japan
 125 Years Memory, a 2015 Japanese-Turkish drama film commemorating Japanese-Turkish friendship
 Altaic languages
 Turanism

References

External links 
 The Ministry of Foreign Affairs of Japan: Japan-Turkey relations
 Japanese embassy in Ankara
 Japanese consulate-general in Istanbul
 Turkish embassy in Tokyo

 
Turkey
Bilateral relations of Turkey